Straight No Filter is an album by jazz saxophonist Hank Mobley, recorded mostly in 1963 but not released on the Blue Note label until 1985. The CD edition compiles performances recorded at four different sessions from 1963 to 1966.

Reception 
The Allmusic review by Ronnie D. Lankford, Jr. awarded the album 4½ stars stating "Straight No Filter will be welcomed by Mobley's fans and lovers of hard bop. It shouldn't be missed.".

Track listing 
All compositions by Hank Mobley, except where noted.

1985 LP
 "Straight No Filter" – 5:58
 "Chain Reaction" – 11:02
 "Soft Impressions" – 4:48
 "Third Time Around" – 6:25
 "Hank's Waltz" – 7:43
 "The Feelin's Good" – 5:40

2001 CD reissue
 "Straight No Filter" – 5:58
 "Chain Reaction" – 11:02
 "Soft Impressions" – 4:48
 "Third Time Around" – 6:25
 "Hank's Waltz" – 7:43
 "Syrup and Biscuits" – 5:36
 "Comin' Back" – 6:26
 "The Feelin's Good" – 5:40
 "Yes Indeed" (Sy Oliver) – 5:34

Personnel 
Tracks 1–3
 Hank Mobley – tenor saxophone
 Lee Morgan – trumpet
 McCoy Tyner – piano
 Bob Cranshaw – bass
 Billy Higgins – drums

Tracks 4–5
 Hank Mobley – tenor saxophone
 Freddie Hubbard – trumpet
 Barry Harris – piano
 Paul Chambers – bass
 Billy Higgins – drums

Tracks 6–7
 Hank Mobley – tenor saxophone
 Lee Morgan – trumpet
 Andrew Hill – piano
 John Ore – bass
 Philly Joe Jones – drums

Tracks 8–9
 Hank Mobley – tenor saxophone
 Donald Byrd – trumpet
 Herbie Hancock – piano
 Butch Warren – bass
 Philly Joe Jones – drums

References 

Hank Mobley albums
1985 albums
Albums produced by Alfred Lion
Blue Note Records albums